The Catholic Diocese of Le Mans (Latin: Dioecesis Cenomanensis; French: Diocèse du Mans) is a Catholic diocese of France. The diocese is now a suffragan of the Archdiocese of Rennes, Dol, and Saint-Malo but had previously been suffragan to Bourges, Paris, Sens, and Tours (in ascending order).

Area
The Diocese of Le Mans comprises the entire department of Sarthe, created during the French Revolution on 4 March 1790, pursuant to the law of 22 December 1789; the province of Maine was divided into two departments, Sarthe to the east and Mayenne to the west. Prior to the French Revolution it included 636 parishes and was one of the most extensive dioceses of France; at the time of the Concordat of 1801, it lost some parishes in Vendômois and Normandy and acquired some in Anjou. The Diocese of Le Mans embraced 665 communes from then up to the year 1855, when the department of Mayenne was detached from it to form the Diocese of Laval.

History

The origin of the Diocese of Le Mans has given rise to extensive discussions among scholars, concerning the value of the Gesta domni Aldrici, and of the Actus Pontificum Cenomannis in urbe degentium.  Collectively called "the Le Mans forgeries", they were compiled in the episcopal curia at Le Mans during the episcopate of Aldric (832-857).  The work of forgery extends to early charters of the diocese, and even to various saints' lives.  Even the Testament of Bishop Aldric has been rewritten to conform to the purposes of the forgers:  to enhance the authority of the bishop and his claims to various holdings in the diocese, notably monasteries which were normally under the protection of the King.  This applied especially to the monastery of St. Calais.  The claims were not accepted, either by the bishops and abbots at the Council of Verberie or by Charles the Bald.

There was once a survey (pouillé) of the diocese, written in the reign of Bishop Bertrand in the last part of the sixth century, but it too was taken and used by the ninth century forger of the Actus Pontificum Cenomannis in urbe degentium, thereby rendering its testimony useless.  It names among the thirty four parishes allegedly created by "Saint Julianus", one of the seventy two disciples of Christ, several parishes recently created in the ninth century.

The "Gesta" relate that Bishop Aldric (ca. 800-857) had the bodies of Saints Julianus, Turibius, Pavatius, Romanus, Liborius, and Hadoindus, first bishops of Mans, brought to his cathedral; the Acts make St. Julianus one of the seventy-two disciples of Christ and state that he arrived at Le Mans with two companions: Turibius, who became bishop under Antoninus (138-161), and Pavatius who was bishop under Maximinus (235-238) and under Aurelian (270-275), in which event, Pavatius would have lived over two hundred years. Liborius, successor of Pavatius, would have been the contemporary of Valentinian (364-375).  Of course, if Julian had been of the apostolic age, he would not have been termed a 'bishop', nor would he have founded a church or cathedral.  Christians were not a legal cult until the time of Constantine I (d. 337), and a diocese could neither own property as a collective entity nor build public places of worship.

According to the Catholic Encyclopedia, "these chronological absurdities of the Acts have led Louis Duchesne to conclude that the first Bishop of Le Mans whose episcopate can be dated with certainty is Victurius, who attended the Councils of Angers and of Tours, in 453 and 461, and to whom Gregory of Tours alludes as 'a venerable confessor'.  Turibius who, according to the Acts, was the successor of Julianus, was, on the contrary, successor to Victurius and occupied the see from 490 to 496."

In January 2017, the Diocese of Le Mans set up policy guidelines aimed at tackling the sex abuse crisis facing the Diocese.

Cathedral and churches
The buildings that served as the cathedral of Le Mans before 1080 are known only through textual evidence. Even the textual evidence, such as it is, shows that there was no work of any importance on the cathedral from 557 to 832, the beginning of the reign of Bishop Aldric, though it was interrupted by his flight from his diocese. The new choir, at least, was consecrated before his flight, in 834, according to the Acta. During the reign of Bishop Gontier, the town of Le Mans was attacked and the cathedral was pillaged by Comte Rotger.

A new and larger cathedral of St. Julian of Mans was begun under Bishop Vulgrin, but the choir collapsed and had to be rebuilt by Bishop Arnaud (1065-1081), and work continued for the rest of the century. There was a fire in Le Mans in 1134 which damaged the cathedral, and work had to be undertaken again.  Between 1217 and 1254 a new choir was built, and the supposed relics of St. Julien placed in a splendid new home. The building exhibits specimens of all styles of architecture up to the fifteenth century, its thirteenth century choir being one of the most remarkable in France.

On 3 October 1230, Bishop Maurice (1215–1231) issued a charter in which he suppressed the offices of the six Archpriests who had served the diocese, and instituted six territorial Archdeacons in their place, all of whom were to be ordained priests within a year of their appointment:  the Archdeacons of Mans, Sabolio, Lavalle, Castrildis, Montfort, and Passeyo.  The arrangements were approved by the Roman Curia in 1232. The Chapter of the Cathedral had nine dignities:  the Dean, the Cantor, the Scholasticus, and the six Archdeacons.  There were thirty eight prebends and four semi-prebends. All the offices were in the gift of the bishop, except that of the Dean, who was elected by the Chapter.

In the winter of 1447/1448 southern Maine was under attack from the French armies of Charles VII.  The English garrison in Le Mans was besieged, and on 16 March 1448 surrendered to the French.

The city of Le Mans was occupied and pillaged by the Huguenots between 3 April 1562 and 11 July 1562.  Ideologically the cathedral was a special target, where anything smacking of Catholic practices and traditions was destroyed, but also the cathedral was a repository of precious gold, silver and jewels, and also the baser metals, bronze, brass and iron, which could be used for military purposes.  Although the Huguenots were driven away by an approaching royal army, they continued to wreak havoc on the diocese and its churches and monasteries. On 5 May 1583 there was a fire in the cathedral, which damaged the vaults and destroyed the silver bell in the Choir.

The church of Notre-Dame de la Couture (originally dedicated to S. Peter) dates from the thirteenth, fourteenth, and fifteenth centuries, traces of earlier buildings having disappeared completely. The Abbey of Solesmes, founded by Geoffroy de Sablé in 993 and completed in 1095, has a thirteenth-century which is a veritable museum of sculptures of the end of the fifteenth and sixteenth centuries. Its "Entombment of Christ," in terracotta, is famous; the Mary Magdalen in the group, already celebrated even in the fifteenth century for its beauty attracted the attention of Richelieu, who thought of having it brought to Paris. Several sculptures depicting scenes in the life of the Virgin Mary form a series unique in France.

Bishops of Le Mans

To 1000

St. Julianus (Julian)
Turibius (see below)
Pavatius, Pavacius
Liborius (348-396)
Romanus
Victurius (450s and 60s)
Turibius (490-496)
Principius (497-511)
Innocentius (532-43)
Domnolus (560-81)
Bertechramnus, Bertram, Bertran, Bertrand (587-623), founder of the Abbey of Notre-Dame de la Couture
Hadoindus, Haduin, Harduin (623-54)
Berecharius, Berarius, Beraire (655-70)
St. Aldric (832-57).  
Robert (857-883/5), famous for the forgeries that appeared at Le Mans under him
Aiglibert
 Mainardus
 Segenfredus, Seinfroy (d. 997)

1000 to 1500

Avesgaud of Bellème (997-1036)
Gervais de Château-du-Loir 1036–1055
Wilgrin 1055–1064
Arnaud 1067–1081
Hoël 1085–1097
Hildebert of Lavardin 1097–1125
Guy D'Etampes 1126–1135
Hugues de Saint-Calais 1135–1142
Guillaume de Passavant 1142–1186
Renaud 1186–1189
Hamelin 1190–1214
Nicolas 1214–1216
Maurice 1215–1231 (or 1234)
Geoffroi de Laval 1231–1234
Geoffroi de Loudon 1234–1255
Guillaume Roland 1256–1260
Geoffroi Freslon 1260–1274
Geoffroi D`Assé 1274–1277
Jean de Toulay 1277–1294
Pierre Le Royer 1294–1295
Denis Benoit 1296–1298
Robert de Clinchamp 1298–1309
Pierre de Longueil 1312–1326
Guy de Laval 1326–1339
Geoffroi de La Chapelle 1339–1350
Jean de Craon 1350–1355
Michel de Briche 1355–1368
Gonthier de Baignaux 1368–1385
Pierre de Savoisy 1385–1398
Adam Chatelain 1398–1439
 Jean d'Hierray (Jean D'Ansières, Jean de Jeriau) 1439–1451
Martin Berruyer 1452–1467
Thibaud de Luxembourg 1468–1474 (Cardinal)
Philippe de Luxembourg 1477–1507

1500-1800

Franz von Luxemburg 1507–1509 (also Bishop of Saint-Pons de Thomières)
Philippe de Luxemburg 1509–1519 (second time)
Louis de Bourbon 1519–1535 (Cardinal)
René du Bellay 1535–1546
Jean du Bellay 1542–1556 (Cardinal, 1 Nov 1542 Appointed – 27 Jul 1556 Resigned)
Charles d'Angennes de Rambouillet 1559–1587 (Cardinal)
Claude d'Angennes de Rambouillet 1588–1601
Charles de Beaumanoir de Lavardin 1601–1637
Emmeric-Marc de La Ferté 1637–1648
Philibert-Emmanuel de Beaumanoir de Lavardin 1648–1671
Louis de La Vergne de Monthirard de Tressan 1671–1712
Pierre-Roger du Crévy 1712–1729
Charles-Louis de Froulay de Tessé 1729–1767
Louis-André de Grimaldi 1767–1777 (19 Apr 1767 Appointed – 16 Oct 1777 Appointed Bishop of Noyon)
François-Gaspard de Jouffroy de Gonsans 1777–1790
Jacques-Guillaume-René-François Prudhomme de La Boussinière 1791–1793 (Constitutional Bishop of Sarthe)

From 1800
Johann Michael Josef von Pidoll de Quitenbach † (9 Apr 1802 Appointed – 23 Nov 1819 Died)
Claude-Madeleine de La Myre-Mory † (5 Dec 1819 Appointed – 22 Dec 1828 Resigned)

Philippe-Marie-Thérèse-Guy Carron † (16 Apr 1829 Appointed – 27 Aug 1833 Died)
Jean-Baptiste Bouvier † (22 Nov 1833 Appointed – 29 Dec 1854 Died)
Jean-Jacques Nanquette † (30 Aug 1855 Appointed – 19 Nov 1861 Died)
Charles-Jean Fillion † (14 Jan 1862 Appointed – 28 Jul 1874 Died)
Hector-Albert Chaulet d'Outremont † (14 Sep 1874 Appointed – 14 Sep 1884 Died)
Guillaume-Marie-Joseph Labouré † (31 Dec 1884 Appointed – 13 Jun 1893 Appointed Archbishop of Rennes (Dol, e Saint-Malo))
Charles-Joseph-Louis-Abel Gilbert † (29 Jan 1894 Appointed – Aug 1897 Resigned)
Marie-Prosper-Adolphe de Bonfils † (22 Mar 1898 Appointed – 2 Jun 1912 Died)
Raymond-Marie-Turiaf de La Porte † (12 Aug 1912 Appointed – 30 Nov 1917 Resigned)
Georges-François-Xavier-Marie Grente † (30 Jan 1918 Appointed – 4 May 1959 Died)
Paul-Léon-Jean Chevalier † (4 May 1959 Succeeded – 28 Oct 1971 Retired)
Bernard-Pierre-Edmond Alix † (28 Oct 1971 Succeeded – 13 Aug 1981 Resigned)
Georges Edmond Robert Gilson (13 Aug 1981 Appointed – 2 Aug 1996 Appointed, Archbishop of Sens)
Jacques Maurice Faivre † (29 Jul 1997 Appointed – 3 Jul 2008 Resigned)
Yves Le Saux (21 Nov 2008 Appointed – 27 Jun 2022 Appointed, Bishop of Annecy)

La Flèche

The Jesuit Collège Henri IV de La Flèche, in the town of La Flèche, founded in 1603 by Henry IV, enjoyed a great reputation for a century and a half, and the Marshal de Guébriant, Descartes, Marin Mersenne, Prince Eugene of Savoy, and Pierre Séguier (brother of the Chancellor of France Antoine de Séguier) were all numbered among its students.

The Dominican convent of Le Mans, begun (according to local myth) about 1219 and, according to the claim, during the lifetime of St. Dominic, was able to begin its construction thanks to the benefactions of one 'John of Troezen', Count of Maine, an English nobleman. Louis IX of France contributed personally to the completion of the works.  The house was far less wealthy when the theologian Nicolas Coeffeteau, who died in 1623, began his career as a Dominican by taking his vows at Le Mans in 1588, and who later became Bishop of Marseille. The French Revolution swept away this convent.

Saints in Le Mans

The diocese honours in a special manner as saints: Peregrinus, Marcoratus, and Viventianus, martyrs; Hilary of Oizé, nephew of St. Hilary of Poitiers (in the fifth century); Bommer, Almirus, Leonard, and Ulphace, hermits; Gault, Front, and Brice, solitaries and previously monks of Micy; Fraimbault, hermit, founder of a small monastery in the valley of Gabrone; Calais, hermit and founder of the monastery of Anisole, from whom the town of Saint-Calais took its name; Laumer, successor to St. Calais; Guingalois or Guénolé, founder of the monastery of Landevenec in Brittany, whose relics are venerated at Château du Loir.

All in the sixth century: Rigomer, monk at Souligné, and Ténestine, his penitent, both of whom were acquitted before Childebert, through the miracle of Palaiseau, of accusations made against them (d. about 560); Longis, solitary, and Onofletta, his penitent; Siviard, Abbot of Anisole and author of the life of St. Calais (d. 681); the Irish St. Cérota, and her mistress Osmana, daughter of a king of Ireland, died a solitary near St-Brieuc, in the seventh century; Ménélé, and Savinian (d. about 720), natives of Précigné, who repaired to Auvergne to found the Abbey of Menat, on the ruins of the hermitage where St. Calais had formerly lived.

There is also a particular devotion in Le Mans to Ralph de La Fustaye, who was a twelfth century monk, a disciple of Robert d'Arbrissel the founder of Fontevrault Abbey and missionary to prostitutes; Ralph was founder of the Abbey of St. Sulpice, in the forest of Nid de Merle in the Diocese of Rennes in Brittany. Both were Bretons; neither was connected to Le Mans; neither became a saint.

The famous founder of the Trappists, Abbot de Rancé, made his novitiate at the Cistercian Perseigne Abbey in the Diocese of Le Mans, though his subsequent career was entirely elsewhere: his uncle was Archbishop of Tours, where he was appointed Archdeacon.

Also there may be mentioned as natives of the diocese, Urbain Grandier, the notorious curé of Loudun, who was tortured and burned to death for sorcery in 1634; and Mersenne, the Minim (d. 1648), philosopher and mathematician and friend of Descartes and Pascal.

Pilgrimages to Notre-Dame de Toutes Aides at Saint-Remy du Plein, Notre-Dame de La Faigne at Pontvallain, and Notre-Dame des Bois at La Suze, date back to primitive times. The chapel of Notre Dame de Torcé, erected in the sixth century, has been much frequented by pilgrims since the eleventh century. Besides these places of pilgrimage may be mentioned those of Notre-Dame de Labit at Domfront, and of Notre-Dame du Chene at Vion, near Sablé, which can be traced to 1494. It was established in the place where in former times Urban II had preached the First Crusade.

Cult of St. Scholastica

During the episcopate of Berecharius (655-70) the body of St. Scholastica was brought from the monastery of Fleury to Le Mans; the monastery erected to shelter the remains of the saint was destroyed by the Northmen in the second half of the ninth century. A portion of her relics was brought in 874 by the Empress Richilda to the monastery of Juvigny les Dames. The remaining portion was conveyed to the interior of the citadel and placed in the apse of the collegiate church of St. Pierre la Cour, which served the counts of Maine as a domestic chapel. The fire that destroyed Le Mans, 3 September 1134, also consumed the shrine of St. Scholastica, and only a few calcined bones were left. On 11 July 1464, a confraternity was erected in honour of St. Scholastica, and on 23 November 1876, she was officially proclaimed patroness of Le Mans.

See also
 Catholic Church in France

References

Bibliography

Reference works
 pp. 562–563. (Use with caution; obsolete)
  (in Latin) pp. 180–181.
 (in Latin) p. 124.
 p. 162.
 pp. 145.
 pp. 154.
 p. 159.

Studies

 second edition  pp. 312–344.

Woodcock, Philippa (2011), "Was original best? Refitting the Churches of the Diocese of Le Mans, 1562-1598,"

External links
 Goyau, Georges (1910). "Le Mans." The Catholic Encyclopedia. Vol. 9. New York: Robert Appleton Company, 1910. Retrieved:  2016-09-12.
  Centre national des Archives de l'Église de France, L’Épiscopat francais depuis 1919, retrieved: 2016-12-24.
 Diocese of Le Mans,  Official site 
 David M. Cheney,  Catholic-Hierarchy,   Diocese of Le Mans:  Retrieved: 2016-09-15.

Acknowledgment

Le Mans
Le Mans

it:Diocesi di Le Mans#Cronotassi dei vescovi